James "Mingo" Lewis (born 8 December 1953) is an American percussionist and drummer who played with Santana, Al Di Meola, Return to Forever (he was a band member for Di Meola's first five albums), and The Tubes.

Playing
Lewis plays congas, bongos, timbales, vibraslap, drums, bells, güiro, gong, Syndrum, bata, tambourine, cowbell and assorted percussion.

Writing
Lewis is credited with composition of one song on four of the first five Di Meola albums: "The Wizard" on Land of the Midnight Sun, "Flight Over Rio" on Elegant Gypsy, and "Chasin' The Voodoo" on Casino (retitled from his composition Frankinsence on his 1976 album Flight Never Ending). For The Tubes album Now Lewis wrote "God-Bird-Change", which he reprised on Di Meola's Electric Rendezvous

Selected discography

As Band Leader
 Flight Never Ending (1976)

As session player
 Santana - Caravanserai (1972)
 Carlos Santana & Buddy Miles! Live! (1972)
 Return To Forever - Hymn of the Seventh Galaxy (1973)
 Carlos Santana and John McLaughlin - Love Devotion Surrender (1973)
 Billy Joel - Turnstiles (1976)
 Todd Rundgren - Nearly Human (1982)
 XTC - Skylarking (1986)

With Al Di Meola
 Land of the Midnight Sun (1976)
 Elegant Gypsy (1977)
 Casino (1978) 
 Splendido Hotel (1980)
 Electric Rendezvous (1982)

With The Tubes
 Now (1977)
 What Do You Want from Live (1978)
 Remote Control (1979)
 T.R.A.S.H. (Tubes Rarities and Smash Hits) (1981)

References 

1950 births
20th-century American drummers
American jazz drummers
American jazz keyboardists
American jazz percussionists
American male drummers
Batá drummers
Bongo players
Castanets players
Jazz musicians from New York (state)
Living people
Maracas players
Santana (band) members
Timbaleros
American male jazz musicians

Conga players
Composers by century
Synth-pop albums by British artists
Synth-pop albums by American artists
Al Di Meola albums
Chick Corea albums
Return to Forever albums
XTC albums
Brian Eno albums
David Byrne albums
The Tubes members
The Tubes albums